Belville can refer to:

Places
Belville (Belgrade), an urban neighborhood of Belgrade, the capital of Serbia.
Bell Ville, Córdoba Province, Argentina
 the Belville meteorite of 1937, which fell in Córdoba, Argentina (see Meteorite falls)
Belville, County Westmeath, a townland in the civil parish of Ballyloughloe, barony of Clonlonan, County Westmeath, Republic of Ireland
Belville, North Carolina, United States

People
Pepper (name) may refer to:

Surname
Ruth Belville (1854–1943), known as the Greenwich Time Lady

Given name
Belville Robert Pepper (1850-1888), British opera singer

Toys
Belville (Lego), a line of Lego

See also
Belleville (disambiguation)
Bellville (disambiguation)